Olatunji Ajisomo Abubakar Sadiq Alabi (20 February 1915 – 14 November 1998), better known as Lord Rumens, was a Nigerian noble business tycoon, philanthropist and socialite. Lord Rumens hailed from Abeokuta, and was feom the Egba tribe.

Personal life
Lord Rumens was born in Oke-Ona, Abeokuta, Nigeria. His parents were Alhaji Muktar Alabi Alamutu and Alimotu Sadia Kanleara. Lord Rumens attended Holy Trinity School in Abeokuta before going on to attend Methodist Boys High School in Lagos in 1934. Lord Rumens, as fondly called by his friends and family, worked for Total Oil Nigeria Ltd for many years.

In 1994, Lord Rumens released an autobiography titled "Lord Rumens". The autobiography centered around the journey on his life so far. In the autobiography, he also lamented about the fate of tennis in Nigeria, with quote: "Those who have been entrusted to run out tennis club and championship have been less than serious."

During his reign, Lord Rumens was popularly known for the importation of Carrara Marble into Lagos, Nigeria as well as his love for Tennis. Lord Rumens was also known as the Vice-Chairman Red Fox Industries Nigeria Ltd, Executive Chairman of Tapol Nigeria Ltd as well as the Chairman of Nigeria Marine & Trading Company Ltd.

Sports and philanthropy

Much like his nephew, Molade Okoya -Thomas, Lord Rumens, who was a tennis enthusiast, also has a Tennis court named after him at the Lawn Tennis club in Onikan, Lagos.

Lord Rumens served as the President of Lagos Lawn Tennis Club in Onikan from 1966 to 1975.

In 1971, he brought the likes of the late Arthur Ashe and Stan Smith to Nigeria for a tournament.

Demise
Lord Rumens is survived by 7 children and 14 grandchildren.

In remembrance of the late philanthropist, Lord Rumen has a street named in his honour in Ikoyi, Lagos, Nigeria, known as Lord Rumens road.

References

External links
 ISUU
 Nigeria World

1915 births
1998 deaths
20th-century Nigerian businesspeople
People from colonial Nigeria
History of Lagos
Nigerian socialites
Yoruba businesspeople
Businesspeople from Lagos
Yoruba philanthropists
Nigerian philanthropists
Methodist Boys' High School alumni
Nigerian commodities traders
Okoya-Thomas family